was a Japanese author. She contracted tuberculosis after middle school and had her leg amputated at age 17, after which she took fiction writing lessons from Morita Sōhei, started writing, and wrote throughout the six years until her death. According to scholar Barbara Hartley, Shiraki's willingness to write about body-related issues, such as menstruation, "marks her as singularly incisive and even subversive."

See also
Japanese literature
List of Japanese authors

References

1895 births
1918 deaths
Japanese writers
Japanese amputees